Yang Hui-chun (born 10 April 1970) is a Taiwanese softball player. She competed at the 1996 Summer Olympics and the 2004 Summer Olympics.

References

External links
 

1970 births
Living people
Taiwanese softball players
Olympic softball players of Taiwan
Softball players at the 1996 Summer Olympics
Softball players at the 2004 Summer Olympics
Place of birth missing (living people)
Asian Games medalists in softball
Softball players at the 1990 Asian Games
Softball players at the 1994 Asian Games
Softball players at the 2002 Asian Games
Medalists at the 1990 Asian Games
Medalists at the 1994 Asian Games
Medalists at the 2002 Asian Games
Asian Games silver medalists for Chinese Taipei
Asian Games bronze medalists for Chinese Taipei